Parliamentary elections were held in Portugal on 12 November 1961. The ruling National Union won all 130 seats unopposed.

Electoral system
The number of seats in the National Assembly was increased from 120 to 130 prior to the elections. The number of seats for Angola and Mozambique was increased from four each to seven each, whilst Portuguese India and Cape Verde each gained a seat, taking their totals to three and two respectively. Mainland Portugal also gained two seats.

Following the granting of Portuguese citizenship to the indigenous inhabitants of Angola and Mozambique, they were entitled to vote for the first time as long as they were literate, held a job in a recognised profession, or were taxpayers.

Campaign
A total of 25 opposition candidates registered to run in the elections on 12 lists. They officially withdrew their candidacies on 7 November, protesting against the government's failure to allow "free and clean elections". The Monarchist list was rejected in Lisbon after arriving to hand in their list a minute late.

Results

References

See also
Politics of Portugal
List of political parties in Portugal
Elections in Portugal

Legislative elections in Portugal
Portugal
1961 elections in Portugal
November 1961 events in Europe